Mapeera House is a building in Kampala, the capital and largest city of Uganda.

Location
The skyscraper is located on Plot 44/46, Kampala Road, the main business street in Kampala's central business district, where it intersects with Burton Street. The geographical coordinates of Mapeera House are 0°18'52.0"N, 32°34'42.0"E (Latitude:0.314444; Longitude:32.578333).

Overview
Mapeera House is named after Père Siméon Lourdel (1853–1890) M.Afr., referred to in French as Mon Pere and also known as Fr. Mapera. "Mapeera" is the Baganda rendition of "Mon Pere". He was the first Catholic Priest to set foot in Uganda in 1879. Mapeera House serves as the headquarters of Centenary Bank, the third-largest bank in Uganda, and the largest indigenous commercial bank in the country, by assets. The bank also maintains its main branch at this location. However the building is owner-occupied by Centenary Bank. The nineteen-storey building also has  of underground parking space, enough to accommodate up to about 100 vehicles.

History
The idea to construct Mapeera House was the brainchild of the Late Cardinal Emmanuel Kiwanuka Nsubuga (1914–1991), the first Ugandan to be consecrated Cardinal of the Catholic Church. He died before his dream was realized. In October 2007, after ten years of planning, a ground-breaking ceremony was held at the present location, presided over by Cardinal Emmanuel Wamala, second Ugandan to be consecrated Cardinal. ROKO Construction Company, a Ugandan construction company was contracted to construct the building at an estimated cost of approximately US$30 million (USh75 billion). The building was commissioned on 10 June 2012, by Yoweri Museveni, the president of Uganda. At completion, the construction costs had increased to US$40 million (UGX:100 billion).

See also

References

External links
 Mapeera House Commissioned On 10 June 2012 (In the original Luganda).

Buildings and structures in Kampala
Commercial buildings completed in 2012
Skyscraper office buildings in Uganda
2012 establishments in Uganda
Kampala Central Division
Centenary Bank